Splendid China Mall (Traditional Chinese: 錦繡中華; Simplified Chinese: 锦绣中华) (formerly known as Splendid China Tower) is a  Chinese-themed ethnic shopping centre located at the southeast corner of Redlea Avenue and Steeles Avenue in the Scarborough district of Toronto, Ontario, Canada. It is on the Scarborough side of Steeles Avenue (the other side is in Markham, Ontario). It is located adjacent to Milliken GO Station and across from the Pacific Mall along with the now closed Market Village. The structure was formerly occupied by Canadian Tire.

Chinese language signs
Scarborough's local sign bylaws limit the size a business may post signs in one singular language. The signs the centre has (in Chinese characters) taken up the permitted total wall acreage, so permission had to be sought to add an English sign.

See also
 Chinese Canadians in the Greater Toronto Area

References

External links

June 2007 Zoning Application to the City of Toronto
 Darren Susilo, "Inside Splendid China Tower", BlogTO, June 20, 2012.

Chinese-Canadian culture in Toronto
Shopping malls in Toronto
Buildings and structures in Scarborough, Toronto
Shopping malls established in 2007
2007 establishments in Ontario
Ethnic shopping centers